Francis Inigo Thomas (25 December 1865 – 27 March 1950) was a British artist and garden designer.

Thomas was born in Warmsworth, Yorkshire, the fifth son of Rev. Charles Edward Thomas and Georgiana Mary Hely-Hutchinson, daughter of Hon. Henry Hely-Hutchinson. She was the granddaughter of Hon. Francis Hely-Hutchinson and niece of the 3rd Earl of Donoughmore. He was a cousin of Sir Charles Inigo Thomas, also known as Inigo. Thomas was the nephew of William Brodrick Thomas (1811–98), one of the principal garden designers of the latter half of the 19th century.

Thomas trained in the office of the architects G. F. Bodley and Thomas Garner.

As well as designing numerous formal gardens, he illustrated Reginald Blomfield's book The Formal Garden in England, which was published in 1892.

Works
Rock garden for Sandringham House, Norfolk, 1870s
Gardens for Barrow Court, Barrow Gurney, Somerset, 1882–96
Formal gardens for Athelhampton Hall, Dorset, 1891 onwards
Gardens for Parnham House, near Beaminster, Dorset
Gardens for Rotherfield Hall, Rotherfield, East Sussex, 1897
Gardens for Otley Hall, Ipswich, Suffolk
Tirah Memorial, Bonn Square, Oxford, 1900
Terraced gardens for Ffynone, Pembrokeshire, 1904
Terraced garden for Chantmarle, near Frome St Quintin, Dorset, 1910

References

Sources

1865 births
1950 deaths
English gardeners
People from the Metropolitan Borough of Doncaster